Sociāldemokrats was a daily newspaper in interbellum Latvia, the central organ of the Latvian Social Democratic Workers Party.

References

Latvian-language newspapers
Defunct newspapers published in Latvia
Publications with year of establishment missing
Publications with year of disestablishment missing
Socialist newspapers